Sumsky Uyezd or Sumy Povit was one of the subdivisions of the Kharkov Governorate of the Russian Empire. It was situated in the northwestern part of the governorate. Its administrative centre was Sumy.

Demographics
At the time of the Russian Empire Census of 1897, Sumsky Uyezd had a population of 228,094. Of these, 91.9% spoke Ukrainian, 7.0% Russian, 0.4% Yiddish, 0.2% German, 0.2% Polish, 0.1% Belarusian and 0.1% Tatar as their native language.

References

Uezds of Kharkov Governorate
Kharkov Governorate